"Non c'è" (English: It's Not Here) is an Italian ballad written by Pietro Cremonesi, Angelo Valsiglio and Federico Cavalli and recorded by pop singer Laura Pausini. It is the second single from the singer's first album, Laura Pausini. The song was also recorded in Spanish under the title "Se fue" (He's Gone) and included in Pausini's Spanish-language debut album, released in 1994. A remix version of "Se fue" was released in 1994 and became popular in Spanish dance clubs. The song later became one of Pausini's best known singles.

A new version of the song is also included on the 2001 compilation album The Best of Laura Pausini: E ritorno da te, featuring Italian singer Nek playing bass. The same arrangements were used for the Spanish-language counterpart, "Se fue", included in Lo mejor de Laura Pausini: Volveré junto a ti.

In 2013, Pausini recordered a new version for her 2013 compilation album 20 - The Greatest Hits featuring American singer Marc Anthony in a salsa style by Sergio George. This version received a nomination for Tropical Collaboration of the Year at the 2015 Lo Nuestro Awards.

The song is widely known as the follow on from Laura Pausini's first single "La solitudine".

Track listing

Charts

Weekly charts

"Non c'è"

"Se fue"

"Se fué" (featuring Marc Anthony)

Covers
The song was covered by Brazilian brother-sister singing duo Sandy & Junior, a Portuguese-language version, "Não Ter". Milly Quezada performed a cover with her band Milly y Los Vecinos. This version peaked at #10 on the Billboard Tropical Songs.

Croatian singer Vesna Pisarović also covered the song under the title "Da znaš" ("If only you knew").

References

Laura Pausini songs
1993 singles
Pop ballads
Italian-language songs
Spanish-language songs
Milly Quezada songs
1993 songs
1996 singles
2014 singles
Marc Anthony songs
Song recordings produced by Sergio George
Songs written by Angelo Valsiglio